Diário As Beiras is one of the three main newspapers of Coimbra, Portugal.

References

Mass media in Coimbra
Diario de Coimbra
Portuguese-language newspapers
Newspapers established in 1986
1986 establishments in Portugal